The 2002 American Le Mans at Mid-Ohio was the third round of the 2002 American Le Mans Series season.  It took place at Mid-Ohio Sports Car Course, Ohio, on June 30, 2002.

Official results
Class winners in bold.

Statistics
 Pole Position - #1 Audi Sport North America - 1:14.169
 Fastest Lap - #2 Audi Sport North America - 1:14.815
 Distance - 403.363 km
 Average Speed - 146.380 km/h

External links
 
 World Sports Racing Prototypes - Race Results

M
Sports Car Challenge of Mid-Ohio
American Le Mans at Mid-Ohio